Chili is an unincorporated community in Crawford Township, Coshocton County, Ohio, United States.

History
Chili originally grew up around a blacksmith shop which was established there. The community was platted in 1834. A post office opened under the name Winklepeck's in 1834, the name was changed to Chili in 1838, and the post office closed in 1908. The distinguished surgeon George Washington Crile was born in Chili.

References

Populated places in Coshocton County, Ohio